Tong Dizhou (May 28, 1902 – March 30, 1979) was a Chinese embryologist known for his contributions to the field of cloning. He was a vice president of Chinese Academy of Science.

Biography
Born in Yinxian, Zhejiang province, Tong graduated from Fudan University in 1924 with a degree in biology, and received a PhD in zoology in 1930 from Free University Brussels (ULB).

From 1950 to 1956, he was a supporter of Lysenkoism.

In 1963, Tong inserted DNA of a male carp into the egg of a female carp and became the first to successfully clone a fish. He is regarded as "the father of China's clone".

Tong was also an academician at the Chinese Academy of Sciences and the first director of its Institute of Oceanology from its founding in 1950 until 1978.

Tong died on 30 March 1979 at Beijing Hospital in Beijing.

References

1902 births
1979 deaths
20th-century biologists
20th-century Chinese scientists
Biologists from Zhejiang
Cloning
Educators from Ningbo
Free University of Brussels (1834–1969) alumni
Fudan University alumni
Academic staff of Fudan University
Members of Academia Sinica
Members of the Chinese Academy of Sciences
Academic staff of the National Central University
Scientists from Ningbo
Academic staff of Tongji University
Vice Chairpersons of the National Committee of the Chinese People's Political Consultative Conference